The Lorain County Metroparks in Lorain County, Ohio is one of several Metroparks systems in Ohio. It is closest in proximity to the Cleveland Metroparks system. The Lorain County Park District was formed in 1957 and has grown to cover . It is supported mostly through a 1-mill property tax.

The Park District passed 50 years old in 2007.

External links
 Lorain County Metroparks Home Page
 Map

Protected areas of Lorain County, Ohio
Landmarks in Ohio
Park districts in Ohio